Milev is a Bulgarian masculine surname, its feminine counterpart is Mileva. It may refer to

Emil Milev (born 1964), Bulgarian sport shooter 
Geo Milev (1895–c.1925), Bulgarian poet, journalist, and translator
Milev Rocks in Antarctica, named after Geo Milev
Ivan Milev (1897–1927), Bulgarian painter 
Krum Milev (1915–2000), Bulgarian football player and manager
Leda Mileva (1920–2013), Bulgarian writer, translator and diplomat, daughter of Geo
Milena Mileva Blažić (born 1956), Slovenian literary historian 
Nasko Milev (born 1996), Bulgarian football player
Nikola Milev (1881–1925), Bulgarian historian, publicist and diplomat
Ralitsa Mileva (born 1993), Bulgarian artistic gymnast
Yana Milev, German artist, philosopher, author and sociologist
Zdravko Milev (1929–1984), Bulgarian chess player

Bulgarian-language surnames